Offizierstellvertreter (Warrant Officer) Reinhold Jörke was a World War I flying ace credited with 14 confirmed aerial victories.

Biography
He was posted to Royal Prussian Jagdstaffel 12 on 27 February 1917, and scored his first victory with them on 24 March 1917 by downing British ace Cyril Lowe. Jörke ran up nine victories by 18 September 1917. He then switched to Royal Prussian Jagdstaffel 13, and scored a single win, his tenth, with them, on 21 February 1918. In June 1918, he was posted to Royal Prussian Jagdstaffel 39 as it returned from Italy. He lasted out the war with them, scoring four more victories in August and September 1918.

Aerial victories

Doubled dividing lines in list denote Jörke's change of squadrons.

Sources of information

References
 Above the Lines: The Aces and Fighter Units of the German Air Service, Naval Air Service and Flanders Marine Corps 1914 - 1918 Norman L. R. Franks, et al. Grub Street, 1993. , .

Year of birth missing
Year of death missing
German World War I flying aces
Recipients of the Iron Cross (1914), 1st class
Luftstreitkräfte personnel